Kaiserslautern Military Community is a community of Americans living in and around Kaiserslautern, Germany, supporting United States Armed Forces and NATO installations, such as the Ramstein Air Base, Landstuhl Regional Medical Center, Kapaun Air Station, Vogelweh Housing Area, Pulaski Barracks, Kleber Kaserne, Daenner Kaserne, Sembach Kaserne, Miesau Army Depot, and Rhine Ordnance Barracks. With around 54,000 people, including military service members, Department of Defense civilians and contractors as well as their families, the KMC is the largest U.S. military community outside of the United States.

Facilities
A combined Base Exchange (BX) and Post Exchange (PX) located on Ramstein Air Base makes it the largest AAFES shopping-facility in Europe - the Kaiserslautern Military Community Center (KMCC). This has become the biggest attraction for service members and their families. Several well-stocked libraries, several American restaurants (including a Chili's and Romano's Macaroni Grill), and other facilities provide services exclusively for holders of DOD ID cards.

569th United States Forces Police Squadron 

The 569th United States Forces Police Squadron (569 USFPS), based in Vogelweh Military Complex, Germany, is an Air Force Security Forces squadron. The mission of the 569th USFPS is to protect and serve all U.S. forces and Air Force power projection platforms throughout the KMC. The Guardian Eagles, as they are referred to, work hand-in-hand with the U.S. Army 92d Military Police Company, civilian police, and German “Polizei” to accomplish their mission. 

The 569th is the last "Security Police" squadron in the Air Force. All members are recognized by their Security Police ("SP") brassard. The 569 USFPS executes the Air Force's largest law enforcement mission, covering 1.1K square miles and providing police services to over 54,000 DoD personnel and their dependents, all while deploying and redeploying members to 15 different locations worldwide.

Schools
Kaiserslautern Military Community includes DoDDS schools: Kaiserslautern Elementary, Middle, and High School, Vogelweh Elementary, Ramstein Elementary, Intermediate, Middle, and High School, Landstuhl Elementary Middle School, and Sembach Elementary School.

See also
 Husterhoeh Kaserne

References

External links
globalsecurity.org KMC entry
Kaiserslautern American Military Newspaper
Kaiserslautern German-American Community Office
Ramstein AB
U.S. Army Garrison Rheinland-Pfalz Homepage

Military installations of the United States in Germany
Kaiserslautern